Tania, the Beautiful Wild Girl (in Spanish Tania, la bella salvaje) is a Mexican drama film directed by Juan Orol. It was released in 1948 and starring Rosa Carmina and Manuel Arvide.

Plot
Rolando (Manuel Arvide), a millionaire, meets in a South Pacific island a young girl named Tania (Rosa Carmina) an exuberant native which he falls in love. The man decides to take the girl with him to Mexico, where she becomes in a famous cabaret star. But Tania ends betraying and leaves him for another man. Rolando then decides to launch the careers of Fedora (Juanita Riverón), who ends up achieving success. Luck charged Tania her ingratitude, and she ends up falling into ruin.

Cast
 Rosa Carmina as Tania
 Manuel Arvide as Rolando
 Juanita Riverón as Fedora
 Kiko Mendive as Monito
 Lilia Prado as Tania's friend

Reviews
This was the second film directed by Juan Orol with his second film muse: the exuberant Cuban rumbera Rosa Carmina. The film was filmed shortly after her film debut in the film A Woman from the East. Rosa Carmina says: "Begins to like my presence, my films are very successful. I start doing tours throughout Mexico. My dance number was the song wrote by Armando Valdez for the film: "Bururu Manengue" and it was based on pure drums."

References

External links
 
 Logbook of the National Auditorium of Mexico: Tribute to Juan Orol

1948 films
Mexican black-and-white films
Rumberas films
1940s Spanish-language films
Films directed by Juan Orol
Mexican drama films
1948 drama films
1940s Mexican films